John the Lydian or John Lydus (ca. AD 490 – ca. 565) was a Byzantine administrator and writer on antiquarian subjects.

Life and career 
He was born in 490 AD at Philadelphia in Lydia, whence his cognomen "Lydus". At an early age he set out to seek his fortune in Constantinople, and held high court and state offices in the praetorian prefecture of the East under Anastasius and Justinian. Around 543, Lydus was appointed to a chair of Latin language and literature at an institute of higher education of Constantinople. In 552, he lost Justinian's favour and was dismissed. The date of his death is not known, but he was probably alive during the early years of Justin II (reigned 565–578).

Literary work 
During his retirement he occupied himself in the compilation of works on the antiquities of Rome, three of which have been preserved:
De Ostentis (Gr. ), on the origin and progress of the art of divination
De Magistratibus reipublicae Romanae (Gr. ), especially valuable for the administrative details of the time of Justinian; the work is now dated to 550 by Michael Maas.
De Mensibus (Gr. ), a history of the different pagan festivals of the year.
The chief value of these books consists in the fact that the author made use of the works (now lost) of old Roman writers on similar subjects. Lydus was also commissioned by Justinian to compose a panegyric on the emperor, and a history of his campaign against Sassanid Persia; but these, as well as some poetical compositions, are lost.

He was interested in gynaecology and embryology and included several related passages in his "De Mensibus", with references to previous authors. His sources are mainly Greek, and two of them are Latin.

Editions and translations
There is an edition of De Ostentis by Curt Wachsmuth (1897), with full account of the authorities in the prolegomena.

There is an edition of De Magistratibus and De Mensibus by Richard Wünsch (1898–1903). See also the essay by CB Hase (the first editor of the De Ostentis) prefixed to I. Bekker's edition of Lydus (1837) in the Bonn Corpus scriptorum hist. Byzantinae.

For De Magistratibus, Wünsch's edition has been superseded by Anastasius C. Bandy's 1983 edition and translation.

See also:
The Works of Ioannis Lydus, Vols. I–IV (Edwin Mellen Press, 2013). New critical translations of De Mensibus, De Ostentis and De Magistratibus by Anastasius Bandy. Co-edited by Anastasia Bandy, Demetrios J. Constantelos and Craig J. N. de Paulo.
 John the Lydian, De Magistratibus. On the Magistracies of the Roman Constitution. Translated by T. F. Carney. December 1971, Coronado Press.
 John the Lydian, On powers, or, The magistracies of the Roman state / Ioannes Lydus; introduction, critical text, translation, commentary, and indices by Anastasius C. Bandy. Series: Memoirs of the American Philosophical Society, v. 149 . Philadelphia : American Philosophical Society, 1983, c1982. Greek text, parallel English translation.  Based on the Codex Caseolinus.
 Des magistratures de l'état romain. Jean le Lydien. Text, French translation and commentary by Michel Dubuisson, Jacques Schamp.  Belles Lettres (2006)

Notes

References

External links
Corpus scriptorum historiae byzantinae (Bonn, 1837) edition of the works of John Lydus: Greek, with Latin translation at the bottom of each page.
Joannes Lydus Laurentius  Opera Omnia by Migne Patrologia Graeca: Greek, with analytical indexes
Teubner edition of De Mensibus (1898) by R. Wünsch. (Greek text only)
English translation of De Mensibus (with annotations and introduction) by Mischa Hooker, 2nd ed. (2017)
English translation of selected portions of De Mensibus, Book IV: months February-July, September-December, by Mischa Hooker (1st ed.)

490 births
6th-century deaths
Byzantine writers
6th-century Byzantine people
6th-century Byzantine writers
Byzantine Anatolians
Byzantine officials
Historians of Justinian I
People from Alaşehir
Iberian War
565 deaths